Brooke Shaden (born March 1987) is an American fine art photographer.

Biography 

Shaden was raised in Lancaster, Pennsylvania and graduated from Temple University with bachelor's degrees in Film and English. She began her photography career in Los Angeles, CA creating self-portraits.

At 24 she was the youngest artist in The Annenberg Space for Photography's "Digital Darkroom" exhibition of the work of 17 artists that explored the intersection of art and technology. She has been a guest instructor on the CreativeLIVE website. In January 2014 CreativeLIVE created "The Brooke Shaden Contest" where contestants enter their photo portfolios and answer an essay question to compete for a spot in her 'Master Your Craft' photography workshop in addition to a half day shooting on location with her, rental photo gear from LensProToGo (up to $10K), airfare to Seattle ($500), and three nights stay in Seattle ($264). Shaden is the co-host of The Framed Network's series "The Concept" (a series of shows on YouTube) with fashion photographer Lindsay Adler and hosted her own feature episode "The Brooke Shaden Challenge". She is the author of Inspiration in Photography: Training your mind to make great art a habit published in 2013 by Focal Press.

In 2010 Shaden exhibited "The Re-Imaging of Ophelia" (10 images) at the JoAnne Artman Gallery that commercially represents her, with Katie Johnson cast in the title role, the first image "Jumping In" was used as cover art for Dot Hutchison's young adult novel A Wounded Name.

In 2011 Shaden's semi-self portrait "Running from Wind" was one of eight photographs chosen by Ron Howard that would inspire his and Bryce Dallas Howard's short film Imagin8ion. Shaden spoke, along with others, in the keynote for the 'Photoshop World' conference and expo in Las Vegas in 2013.

Exhibitions

Solo Exhibitions 
2017: Fourth Wall, New Work By Brooke Shaden, Joanne Artman Gallery, New York, NY

2019: Begin Again, Featuring Brooke Shaden, Joanne Artman Gallery, New York, NY

2021: Reflection, Joanne Artman Gallery, New York, NY

2022

 Garrett Museum Of Art, Garrett IN
 Samsara: The Artwork Of Brooke Shaden, Foothills Art Center, Golden, CO

References

External links
 
 The JoAnne Artman Gallery represents Shaden
 Brooke Shaden at Morren Galleries
 Brooke Shaden at Soren Christensen Gallery

1987 births
Living people
American photographers
Artists from Lancaster, Pennsylvania
Temple University alumni
American women photographers
Fine art photographers
21st-century American women